The 1963 Swansea East by-election was a parliamentary by-election held for the British House of Commons constituency of Swansea East on 28 March 1963.

The seat had become vacant when the Labour Member of Parliament (MP) David Mort had died on 1 January 1963, aged 74.  He had held the seat since being elected unopposed at a by-election in 1940.

The Labour candidate, Neil McBride, held the seat for his party.

Result

See also
 Swansea East constituency
 1919 Swansea East by-election
 1940 Swansea East by-election
 Swansea
 List of United Kingdom by-elections
 United Kingdom by-election records

References

Further reading
  
 
A Vision Of Britain Through Time (Constituency elector numbers)
 Richard Kimber's Political Science Resources: UK General Election results October 1959 

By-elections to the Parliament of the United Kingdom in Welsh constituencies
1963 elections in the United Kingdom
1963 in Wales
1960s elections in Wales
20th century in Swansea
Elections in Swansea